Toghan may refer to:

Places
 Tughan-e Baba Gorgor, Kurdistan Province, Iran
 Toghan, Mazandaran, Iran
 Toghan, Tehran, Iran

People
 Toghon (son of Kublai), or Toghan, Togon, who led Mongol armies into Burma and Vietnam
 Toghon Temür (1320-1370), Mongol emperor of Yuan China
 Toghan-Shah Abu Bakr (d. 1185 or 1186), amir of Nishapur from 1174 until his death

See also
 Tughan (disambiguation)